Spam Allstars are a United States nine-piece Hip hop, Latin, funk, and electronica band from Miami, Florida. The band has been described as "road warriors" because of their busy touring schedule. The band has performed at many music festivals including Roskilde, High Sierra, Langerado, Gasparilla Music Festival, Wakarusa, Montreal Jazz Festival, Harbourfront Centre, Santa Monica Pier, Grassroots, and Summerstage. Spam Allstars also recorded an album, The Illustrated Band, with Page McConnell side project Vida Blue, in addition to being featured on Vida Blue's DVD Live at the Fillmore.

Discography 
1999: Pork Scratchings
2000: Pigs in Space
2002: Fuacata Live!
2004: Spam Allstars Contra Los Roboticos Mutantes
2007: electrodomésticos

References

External links 
 Official Site

Musical groups established in 1997
American Latin musical groups